The City of Stonnington is a local government area located within the metropolitan area of Melbourne, Australia.

Within twenty years of the settlement of Melbourne in 1835, the Prahran Municipality (later City of Prahran) was formed in 1855, followed by the Gardiner Road Board (later City of Malvern) in 1856.

The late 19th century saw substantial residential and commercial development such that by 1891 Prahran had a population of almost 40,000 and Malvern 11,000. Following the election of the Kennett government in the Spring of 1992, as part of a comprehensive reorganisation of local government in Victoria, the Cities of Malvern and Prahran were amalgamated to form the City of Stonnington.

The logo of the City of Stonnington features two interlocking celebratory ribbons representing the coming together of the two former cities of Malvern and Prahran.

Following the amalgamation of the cities the Malvern Town Hall was renamed the Stonnington City Centre and it became the corporate headquarters of the new Stonnington City Council. In 2015, the new Stonnington City Centre, opposite at 311 Glenferrie Road, was opened and the Malvern Town Hall reverted to its original name.

The name Stonnington comes from Stonington mansion, the Charles D'Ebro-designed mansion built in 1890 for a founding partner of Cobb & Co, John Wagner, who named the house after his wife's birthplace in Stonington, Connecticut, USA. The house is located in Glenferrie Road, Malvern.

The City of Stonnington had a population of 116,207 in June 2018.

The City of Stonnington is the richest local government area in Victoria.

History

Prior to European settlement, the land of the City of Stonnington was occupied by the Wurundjeri, an Indigenous Australian Woiwurrung speaking people of the Kulin nation.

The establishment of European settlers in what was then the Port Phillip District of New South Wales in 1835, was soon followed by pastoralist John Gardiner, together with Joseph Hawdon and John Hepburn, driving cattle south from Yass to Kooyong Koot (later named Gardiner's) Creek, in the area now known as Malvern and establishing a homestead and grazing property.

The first sale of land by the Crown in the area took place on 10 June 1840 when land bounded by Kooyong Road, Gardiners Creek (Yarra River). Gardiners Creek Road (now Toorak Road) and Glenferrie Road was sold. The purchasers included Jane Hill (the widow of pastoralist David Hill), the Langhorne Bros. (the nephews of Captain William Lonsdale), Capt. John Browne and James Jackson.

The high ground between Gardiner's Creek Road (now Toorak Road) and the river returned the best prices and it was here that most of the grand mansions of the period were built. Much of the land south of Toorak Road was swampy. This area was subdivided into much smaller blocks, for workman's cottages and later to house gold-rush immigrants. The distinction between the two areas remains today in the suburbs of Toorak and South Yarra. Further auctions of land in the Prahran area took place in 1849 and 1850.

The early 1850s saw the return of many miners from the gold diggings to Prahran, resulting in increased development and the gazetting as a municipality in 1855. The population of Prahran at the time of the first council elections was about 8,000. Meanwhile, Government land sales within the area bounded by Kooyong Road, Gardiners Creek and Wattletree Road were held in 1854 and a small settlement grew around Malvern and Glenferrie Roads. The area known as Gardiner (later Malvern) was proclaimed a Roads Board District in 1856 and became a municipality in 1871, taking the name Malvern in 1878.

The 1880s and 1890s saw substantial residential and commercial development in the City of Prahran, such that by 1891 Prahran had a population of almost 40,000. The development of Malvern followed from 1900 onwards and by 1921 Malvern's population was almost 33,000.

Geography

The western part of the city, around South Yarra, Prahran and Windsor, were originally part of the Yarra River flood plain and much of the area was covered by swamps, bogs, and creeks, formed from the run-off from the Malvern Hills to the east. The Albert Park Lake to the west is a remnant of the original flood plain.

The City of Stonnington is bounded by the Yarra River and Gardiners Creek to the north, Warrigal Road to the east, Dandenong Road and Queens Way to the south and Punt Road to the west. Stonnington has numerous tree-lined streets and 126 parks and gardens as well as 27 off-leash parks . Many public reserves occur along the Gardiners Creek valley. The city has some of Melbourne's major shopping precincts in Chapel Street, Glenferrie Road, High Street, Malvern Road and Toorak Road, as well as the Chadstone Shopping Centre. Local sporting venues include Malvern Valley Golf Club, Kooyong Lawn Tennis Club and Harold Holt Memorial Swimming Centre.

Demographics
The following demographic information is from the 2011 Census of Population and Housing, Australian Bureau of Statistics.

 Population – Stonnington has a population of 93,145, of which 52% are female. There are 39,105 occupied dwellings in the city.
 Age – The age structure of the population of Stonnington is different from the Greater Melbourne average with a higher percentage of persons aged 25–34 (21.9%) and a lower percentage of children aged under 15 (13.1%).
 Country of birth – Stonnington has a multicultural population with 29% being born overseas. The top five countries of birth are England, India, China, New Zealand and Greece.
 Language spoken – In 27.6% of homes a language other than English is spoken. The top five languages are Greek, Mandarin, Cantonese, Italian, and Hindi.
 Religious affiliation – 20.8% of people stated their religion as Catholic, 27.2% as no religion, 14.9% as Anglican and 5.7% as Eastern Orthodox.
 Weekly income – The median household income is $1,722. Stonnington has a higher household income when compared to the Greater Melbourne median of $1,333.
 Occupation – 57.4% of the populations gave their occupation as Professional or Manager, compared to the Greater Melbourne average of 36.6%.
 Employment – The unemployment rate in Stonnington was 4.4% compared to 5.5% in Greater Melbourne (4.4%).
 Dwellings – Stonnington has a higher proportion of medium or high density dwellings (64%), compared to the Greater Melbourne average of 28%.
 Housing loan repayments – The median monthly housing loan repayment in Stonnington was $2,447, compared to the Greater Melbourne average of $1,800.
 Households renting  - 43.4% are renting compared to 27% in Greater Melbourne.

Council

Mayors & councillors 

From 1996 until 2004, the mayor was elected annually for the following 12 months in March. From 2004 the election took place in November or December. There was a truncated transitional term of office from March to November 2004.

The preceding mayor, His worship, Steve Stefanopoulos,  was spectacularly dumped by voters, following 3 years as mayor (unprecedented) . His Primary and preference vote collapsed after media reports about his public conduct and self promoting community newsletters.

Current councillor Polly Morgan is a known Greens operative, who searches social media constantly, creating political dossiers on opponents to attempt to embarrass them.

Current councillor Matthew Koce is a member of the Liberal Party yet is seen around council to be more aligned with Greens policies and suggestions having put himself on record as removing support for local trader associations, a very unliberal activity.

The current mayor is Jami Klisaris.
She is known for playing victim, with many community members complaining her “stories” border on fantasy. 
She is the daughter of known high ranking labor member and Monash councillor - Paul Klisaris. The Klisaris family have a long history within the Australian Labor party.

Former councillor, John Chandler, was presented with a portrait from a well known Italian artist in his last term. The portrait made national headlines when it was revealed that prominent developer, Bill McNee commissioned and paid for it. Investigations were launched by IBAC and the local government inspectorate.

The portrait was ultimately returned after causing huge public embarrassment.

There are many stories on social media of a “gang” at work within the council, led by Cr Sehr, Klisaris, Koce & Morgan.

Townships and localities
The 2021 census, the city had a population of 104,703 up from 103,832 in the 2016 census

^ - Territory divided with another LGA

Education

Australia has a system of public (state government) and private (independent) schools. Most public schools are co-educational. Most private schools are administered by their own boards and receive a government subsidy besides having their own fee structure.

Secondary education
Schooling is compulsory for students until the age of fifteen, although many students continue on to complete Year 12. The following are secondary colleges (high schools) in the City of Stonnington:
 De La Salle College, Malvern
 St Kevin's College, Toorak
 The King David School, Armadale
 Korowa Anglican Girls' School, Glen Iris
 Lauriston Girls' School, Armadale
 Loreto Mandeville Hall, Toorak
 Sacré Cœur School, Glen Iris
 St Catherine's School, Toorak
 Melbourne High School, South Yarra
 Prahran High School, Windsor

Additionally, Presentation College, Windsor operated from 1873 to 2020.

Tertiary education
 The Prahran Mechanics' Institute was established in 1854. It grew to have a focus on the arts. The teaching branch of this organisation has gone through numerous changes since then, including becoming a campus of Swinburne University of Technology in 1992, and of Melbourne Polytechnic in 2013.
 Brigidine Teachers' College was located in High St, Malvern at the Kildara school and convent. It moved and became part of the new Christ College in Chadstone in 1966. (The book "Reflections over time: collected stories from a group of women who trained as teachers in Catholic Education in 1960" was published by the Brigidine archive in 2005, and features the college.) The site returned to delivering adult education in 2021, when the Catholic entity Heart of Life began teaching there.
 Mercer House (Associated Teachers' Training College) was located at 11 Mercer Rd, Armadale, a short walk from Lauriston. It was established here in 1946, being a continuation of an earlier college in the city founded in 1921. By 1966, it trained both general primary and lower secondary teachers, as well as art, domestic science and special science teachers. The school aimed to supply teachers to Independent schools. It closed and merged into Toorak Teachers' College in 1975.
 Larnook Domestic Arts Teachers' College at the Larnook mansion, Armadale, was founded in 1950. It later became Larnook Teachers' College, but retained the domestic arts specialisation. It became the Armadale campus of the State College of Victoria at Rusden in 1973. This became part of Victoria College in 1981, forming the Armadale site of its Rusden campus. This closed in 1984. The property then became The King David School.
 Toorak Teachers' College was established by the state government in Malvern in 1951. It moved to the Stonington mansion in Malvern in 1957. This later became the State College of Victoria at Toorak, which became part of Victoria College in 1981. This then became part of Deakin University in 1991. Deakin chose to close the campus in 2006.
 Christ College Teachers' College was established in 1966, from the merger of Brigidine Teachers' College in Malvern and Presentation Teachers' College in Elsternwick. It was temporarily located in Malvern, before moving to a purpose built building in Chadstone in 1968. The college became the Christ Campus of the Australian Catholic University, and its location was later redefined as East Malvern. This campus closed in the year 2000, when its operations merged with those in Ascot Vale, and moved to Fitzroy. The site became part of the Chadstone Shopping Centre car park.

Public transport

Stonnington is extremely well serviced by Melbourne's public transport system. Three suburban railway lines and eight tram services pass through the City of Stonnington, as well as a number of bus services, including 12 services to Chadstone Shopping Centre.

Railways
The Cranbourne, Pakenham and Frankston railway lines provide a regular service to South Yarra, Hawksburn, Toorak, Armadale and Malvern stations. The Sandringham railway line services South Yarra, Prahran and Windsor stations and the Glen Waverley line runs along the northern boundary of Stonnington to Heyington, Kooyong, Tooronga, Gardiner, Glen Iris, Darling, East Malvern and Holmesglen stations.

Trams
All major east–west roads in Stonnington have tram services. Route 3 runs along Balaclava Road and Waverly Road to East Malvern and tram route 5 services Dandenong Road and Wattletree Road and ends at Burke Road in Malvern. Route 6 runs along High Street and terminates at Malvern Road in Glen Iris, while route 72 services Commercial Road, Malvern Road and Burke Road and route 58 travels along Toorak Road and ends at Glenferrie Road in Toorak. Route 78 runs north–south along Chapel Street and Route 16 along Glenferrie Road.

Media
Stonnington has a commercial news website, the Stonnington Leader, which is operated as part of the Herald Sun. When in free newspaper form, the publication had a circulation of about 50,000.

Stonnington News is the City of Stonnington's bi-monthly community newsletter that is delivered to all residents. It features a range of information to help keep residents informed of the latest Council news and views, as well as issues affecting the city. It was previously known as "InStonnington". In 2014 the publication became available online.

88.3 Southern FM is a local community radio station that includes Stonnington in its licence area.

The city maintains a list of newspapers that were previously based in the area.

Stonnington is also covered by the media of Greater Melbourne.

See also
 List of Melbourne suburbs
 Malvern Town Hall
 List of mayors of Malvern
 List of mayors of Prahran

References

 10 Years in the making 1994–2004
 Betty Malone's introduction to Sally Wilde's 'History of Prahran, Vol II: 1925–1990'. Retrieved 14 March 2006
 City of Stonnington Community Profile. Retrieved 12 March 2006
 Victorian Electoral Commission – Results for Stonnington City Council Elections 2004. Retrieved 9 March 2006
 John Butler Cooper, The History of Prahran. Retrieved 29 June 2009
 John Butler Cooper, The History of Malvern. Retrieved 29 June 2009
 Stonnington Mayors and Councillors : Past and Present. Retrieved 27 June 2009

External links

Official website of Stonnington Council

Public Transport Victoria local public transport map
Link to Land Victoria interactive maps

Local government areas of Melbourne
Greater Melbourne (region)